Reed High School may refer to:
Edward C. Reed High School, a school in Sparks, Nevada
Sarah T. Reed High School, a school in New Orleans, Louisiana

See also
 Reed-Custer High School, in Braidwood, Illinois